The House of Lévis or Lévis-Mirepoix is a French noble family. The family originally came from the village of Lévis-Saint-Nom in the Chevreuse valley, in the Yvelines département of Île-de-France. Notable members of the family include:

Philippe de Levis (1435 – 1475), French Roman Catholic bishop and cardinal
Louis Charles de Lévis (1647 – 18 September 1717), nobleman
Anne-Claude de Lévis (31 October 1692 – 5 September 1765), French antiquarian
Gaston Pierre de Lévis (1699 – 1757), Marshal of France
François Gaston de Lévis (20 August 1719 – 20 November 1787), Marshal of France
Pierre-Marc-Gaston de Lévis (7 March 1764 – 15 February 1830), politician, and aphorist
Antoine de Lévis-Mirepoix (1 August 1884 – 16 July 1981), historian, novelist and essayist
 Philomène Marie Charlotte Gaudérique Félicité Ghislaine de Lévis-Mirepoix (11 August 1887 – 27 July 1978), writer better known by her pen name, Claude Silve

References

Further reading 
 Georges Martin, Histoire et généalogie de la Maison de Lévis, Lyon, 2007.

 
French nobility